Fairview, Ontario can mean the following places:
Fairview, Elgin County, Ontario
Fairview, Stormont, Dundas and Glengarry United Counties, Ontario
Fairview, Perth County, Ontario (on Oxford County line)
Fairview, Renfrew County, Ontario
Fairview, Peel Regional Municipality, Ontario
Fairview, Brant County, Ontario